Abdoulaye Kapi Sylla (born September 15, 1982, in Kindia) is a Guinean football player. Currently, he plays in the Championnat de France amateur for AS Yzeure. He played before for Club Industriel Kamsar, AS Angoulême and Tours FC.

He was part of the Guinean 2004 African Nations Cup team, who finished second in their group in the first round of competition, before losing in the quarter finals to Mali.

External links
 

1982 births
Living people
Guinean footballers
Guinean expatriate footballers
Guinea international footballers
Expatriate footballers in France
Angoulême Charente FC players
Tours FC players
AS Moulins players
2004 African Cup of Nations players
Moulins Yzeure Foot players
Association football midfielders